The 1978 Cotton Bowl Classic was the 42nd edition of the college football bowl game, played at the Cotton Bowl in Dallas, Texas, on Monday, January 2. Part of the 1977–78 bowl game season, it matched the top-ranked and undefeated Texas Longhorns of the Southwest Conference (SWC) and the #5 Notre Dame Fighting Irish, an independent. A record crowd of 76,701 turned up to see the coronation of the Longhorns championship season, but Notre Dame surprisingly won as they dominated the Longhorns 38–10.

New Year's Day was on Sunday in 1978, and the major college bowl games were played the following day.

Teams

Notre Dame

Fifth-ranked Notre Dame entered the game at 10–1. In September, they were upset by Mississippi in Jackson, but had won all nine games since.

Texas

Texas had won all eleven games; the closest margins were in October against Oklahoma and Arkansas.

Game summary
Televised by CBS, the game kicked off at around 1 p.m. CST, as did the Sugar Bowl on ABC.

Heisman Trophy winner Earl Campbell of Texas gained 116 yards on 29 carries, but was kept out of the end zone. Tied at three after the first quarter, the Irish scored three touchdowns in eight minutes to lead 24–3; Texas finally got in the end zone late in the second quarter to narrow the lead to fourteen points at halftime. Notre Dame then shut out the Longhorns in the second half while scoring two more touchdowns.

The 28-point loss by the Longhorns resulted in complete chaos in the final polls, with Notre Dame vaulting past #3 Alabama to win the national championship.

Scoring
First quarter
Notre Dame – Dave Reeve 47-yard field goal, 11:35 remaining (after fumble recovery by Ross Browner) ND 3–0
Texas – Russell Erxleben 42-yard field goal, 6:07. Tie 3–3
Second quarter
Notre Dame – Terry Eurick 6-yard run (Reeve kick), 14:56 (after fumble recovery by Jim Browner) ND 10–3
Notre Dame – Eurick 10-yard run (Reeve kick), 11:37 (after fumble recovery by Willie Fry) ND 17–3
Notre Dame – Vagas Ferguson 17-yard pass from Joe Montana (Reeve kick), 7:28 (after interception by Doug Becker) ND 24–3
Texas – Mike Lockett 13-yard pass from Randy McEachern (Erxleben kick), 0:01 ND 24–10
Third quarter
Notre Dame – Ferguson 3-yard run (Reeve kick), 6:49 (after interception by Steve Heimkreiter) ND 31–10
Fourth quarter
Notre Dame – Ferguson 26-yard run (Reeve kick), 9:41 (after fake punt attempt) ND 38–10

Statistics
{| class=wikitable style="text-align:center"
! Statistics !! Notre Dame !! Texas
|-
|First downs ||26 ||16 
|-
|Rushing yards ||53–243 ||50–130
|-
|Passing yards ||156 ||160
|-
|Passing || 14–32–1 || 11–24–3
|-
|Total offense ||85–399 ||74–290
|-
|Fumbles–lost ||0–0||3–3
|-
|Turnovers ||1||6
|-
|Punts–average ||5–30.4 || 3–40.0
|-
|Penalties–yards ||4–37 ||1–5
|}

Aftermath
Texas' loss opened the door to the national championship for several teams: second-ranked Oklahoma was soundly beaten 31–6 by #6 Arkansas in the Orange Bowl nightcap, and in between, fourth-ranked Michigan fell 27–20 to #13 Washington in the Rose Bowl. That left third-ranked Alabama and #5 Notre Dame as the primary teams for the title.

Alabama felt that with their convincing 35–6 win over #9 Ohio State in the Sugar Bowl, they would be champions due to the losses by Texas and Oklahoma, but the pollsters saw it differently. Notre Dame was voted number one in every poll. Perhaps the rout by fellow SWC member Arkansas in the Orange Bowl made the difference as it made Notre Dame's victory over Texas (who had won  at Arkansas in mid-October) even more impressive.

References

Cotton Bowl Classic
Cotton Bowl Classic
Notre Dame Fighting Irish football bowl games
Texas Longhorns football bowl games
Cotton Bowl Classic
January 1978 sports events in the United States